The Borough of Rugby is a local government district with borough status in eastern Warwickshire, England. The borough comprises the town of Rugby where the council has its headquarters, and the rural areas surrounding the town. The borough has a population of 114,400 (2021). Of which, 78,125 live in Rugby itself and the remainder living in the surrounding areas. Aside from Rugby itself, more notable settlements include Binley Woods, Brinklow, Clifton-upon-Dunsmore, Dunchurch, Long Lawford, Monks Kirby, Ryton-on-Dunsmore, Stretton-on-Dunsmore and Wolston, and the new large development of Houlton.

The borough stretches from Coventry to the west, to the borders with Northamptonshire and Leicestershire to the east. It borders the Warwickshire districts of Warwick to the south-west, Stratford to the south, and Nuneaton and Bedworth to the north-west. It includes a large area of the West Midlands Green Belt in the mostly rural area between Rugby and Coventry.

Between 2011 and 2021, the population of Rugby borough saw a 14.3% increase from around 100,100 in to 114,400, meaning it has had the largest percentage increase in population of any local authority area in the West Midlands region since 2011.

History
The present borough was created on 1 April 1974 by the Local Government Act 1972. It was created by a merger of the municipal borough of Rugby (which covered the town of Rugby) and the Rugby Rural District.

The town of Rugby gained the status of an urban district in 1894. At the same time the Rugby Rural District was created covering the surrounding countryside. The town and rural district had separate councils, both based in Rugby. In 1932, Rugby's status was upgraded to that of a municipal borough, and its boundaries expanded to include most of Bilton, Brownsover, Hillmorton and Newbold-on-Avon.

Rugby Borough Council

The headquarters of Rugby Borough Council is based at Rugby Town Hall on Evreux Way in the town centre. The last elections to the council were held in 2022.

One-third of council seats are elected every year, with one year without an election. The political makeup of the council in the past few elections has been:

Sub-divisions

Wards

The borough is divided into 16 wards, with 42 councillors. For a list of wards in Rugby borough see List of wards in Rugby borough by population.

Parishes

The borough of Rugby has 41 civil parishes mainly covering the rural areas of the borough. Rugby town is an unparished area and so does not have a separate town council.

Here is a list of parishes in the borough, some of which contain several settlements. Where a parish contains more than one settlement these are listed in brackets:

Ansty,
Binley Woods, Birdingbury, Bourton and Draycote, Brandon and Bretford, Brinklow, Burton Hastings
Cawston, Church Lawford, Churchover, Clifton-upon-Dunsmore, Combe Fields, Copston Magna, Cosford, 
Dunchurch (incl: Toft)
Easenhall
Frankton, 
Grandborough
Harborough Magna
King's Newnham
Leamington Hastings (incl: Broadwell, Hill & Kites Hardwick), Little Lawford, Long Lawford
Marton, Monks Kirby,
Newton and Biggin
Pailton, Princethorpe
Ryton-on-Dunsmore
Shilton and Barnacle, Stretton Baskerville, Stretton-on-Dunsmore, Stretton-under-Fosse
Thurlaston,
Wibtoft, Willey, Willoughby, Withybrook, Wolfhampcote (incl: Flecknoe & Sawbridge), Wolston, Wolvey.

References 

 
Non-metropolitan districts of Warwickshire
Boroughs in England